Lonsdale may refer to:

Places

Australia
 Lonsdale Street, Melbourne, Victoria
 Lonsdale, South Australia, an industrial suburb of Adelaide
 Point Lonsdale, a coastal township in Victoria

Canada
 Lonsdale Quay, Vancouver, British Columbia
 Lonsdale Tunnel, North Vancouver, British Columbia
 Lower Lonsdale, North Vancouver
 North Vancouver-Lonsdale, a provincial electoral district in British Columbia
 Upper Lonsdale, North Vancouver

United Kingdom
 Lonsdale, the valley of the River Lune in Lancashire and Cumbria, England
 Kirkby Lonsdale, a small town in Cumbria, England
 Lonsdale Hundred, a hundred of the historic English county of Lancashire through which the River Lune flowed
 Lonsdale (UK Parliament constituency), a parliamentary constituency from 1918 to 1950
 Lonsdale College, Lancaster, a constituent college of Lancaster University, England
 Lonsdale Square, London
 Lonsdale Road, Oxford
 Lonsdale Road Reservoir, Barnes, London
 Morecambe and Lonsdale (UK Parliament constituency), a parliamentary constituency from 1950 to 1983
 Morecambe and Lunesdale (UK Parliament constituency), a parliamentary constituency created in 1983
 North Lonsdale (UK Parliament constituency), a parliamentary constituency from 1885 to 1918
 North Lonsdale Rural District, a local government area until 1974, renamed from Ulverston RD in 1960
 Westmorland and Lonsdale (UK Parliament constituency), a parliamentary constituency created in 1983

United States
Listed alphabetically by state
 Lonsdale, Arkansas, a town in Garland County, Arkansas
 Lonsdale, Minnesota, a city in Rice County, Minnesota
 Lonsdale, Rhode Island, a village and historic district in Providence County, Rhode Island
 Lonsdale Sports Arena, a race track that operated in Rhode Island from 1947 to 1956
 Lonsdale, Knoxville, Tennessee, a neighborhood in Knoxville, Tennessee

Other uses
 Lonsdale (surname)
 Earl of Lonsdale, a title created twice: 1784–1802 in the Peerage of Great Britain and since 1807 in the Peerage of the United Kingdom
 The Lonsdale Sisters, Pauline Cingalee & Florence Samuels, English dancing duo in the 1940s and 1950s
 A vitola of cigar named after the 5th Earl of Lonsdale
 Lonsdale (clothing), British boxing, mixed martial arts and clothing brand
 Lonsdale (car), defunct British automobile brand
 Lonsdale Belt, British boxing prize
 Lonsdale Cup, British horse race
 HMAS Lonsdale, a ship and a naval depot of the Royal Australian Navy
 HMVS Londsale, torpedo boat of the Victorian Naval Forces (Australia)